Susan Eckey (born 22 July 1964) is a Norwegian diplomat who was Ambassador to Rwanda. In 2022 she was in Vienna as the new Resident Representative of Norway to Austria.

Life 
Eckey was born in 1964. She took her masters degree in Science in Economics and Business Administration at the Norwegian School of Economics and an International Baccalaureate Diploma in Canada.

She started work at Norway's Ministry of Foreign Affairs in 1991 and in time she represented her country at the United Nations in New York and at the Norwegian embassy in Chile.

In 2012 she was appointed to the advisory committee to the Central Emergency Response Fund (CERF). Members of the advisory group represent themselves and not their country. Other group members included Ahmed Al-Meraikhi of Qatar, Susanna Moorehead from the UK, Ugandan Julius Oketta, Yukie Osa from Japan and Croatian Nancy Butijer.

In 2015 she arrived in her first posting as an ambassador in Uganda. A posting she like and she introduced friends and family to her new home. She was a supporter of the oild industry and schemes to empower entrepreneurs. In 2021 she spoke in Kampala to support a scheme that would see over 5,000 women entrepreneurs funded by a Strengthening Women Entrepreneurs Programme. Women in Uganda are disproportionally under untilized and particularly in Urban areas. The three year programme was funded by Norway and administered locally. In 2019 she became permanent delegate to the ECOSOC, and from 2020 to 2020 she serveed in the Ministry of Foreign Affairs as a head of department.

In 2022 she was in Vienna as the new Resident Representative of Norway to Austria and the IAEA.

References 

1964 births
Living people
Norwegian School of Economics alumni
Norwegian civil servants
Ambassadors of Norway to Uganda
Ambassadors of Norway to Austria